The Visayan rhabdornis (Rhabdornis rabori) is a species of bird currently placed in the starling family, Sturnidae. It is endemic to the central Philippines on the islands of Negros and Panay. It was previously considered a subspecies of the stripe-breasted rhabdornis. It lives in tropical moist montane forest and is threatened by habitat loss.

Description 
EBird describes the bird as "A medium-sized bird of foothill and lower montane forest on Negros and Panay with an off-white throat, a white belly, brown upperparts, darker wings and tail, a black mask, a gray crown, and pale brown sides broadly streaked white. Often perches on dead branches. Similar to Stripe-sided Rhabdornis, but usually found at higher elevations, bill is shorter and thicker, and crown is gray rather than dark with white streaks. Voice includes high-pitched chips and squeals."

Habitat and conservation status 
It lives in sub-montane and montane primary and secondary forest, forest edge and occasionally in clearings with an altitude range of 800 to 1,700 meters above sea level. It is often seen on the upper levels of the forest strata in the canopy.

IUCN Red List has assessed the Visayan rhabdornis as Least Concern, with an estimated population of 2,500 to 9,999 mature individuals. This bird's main threat is extensive habitat loss on Negros and Panay. Primary forests have been almost totally destroyed on Negros (where just 4% of any type of forest cover remained in 1988) and Panay (where 8% remained). Habitat degradation, through clearance for agriculture, timber and charcoal burning, continues to seriously threaten remaining fragments

Conservation actions proposed include surveys to determine the species' status in Negros and Panay and increased forest protection.

References 

Visayan rhabdornis
Visayan rhabdornis
Visayan rhabdornis